Fire Up is a Singaporean Chinese drama which was produced by Wawa Pictures and broadcast on Singapore's free-to-air channel, Mediacorp Channel 8. The drama began production in May 2016 and was shown from 4 to 31 October 2016. The show aired at 9pm on weekdays and had a repeat telecast at 8am the following day and it with starred Thomas Ong and Huang Biren .

Plot
Mistakes are part and parcel of life. Only when one realizes where his fault lies, is one deserving of a second chance. Those who are given a second chance are usually grateful and work harder. Zheng Mei Mei (Huang Biren), after serving her jail term, got to know Zhuang Ying Xiong (Thomas Ong), a son of a wealthy man. In a bid to win over his father’s trust, he invested in “Mei Mei’s Kitchen” for Mei Mei to run. With his backing and her hard work, the business took off. She also employed several ex-convicts to help out in the shop, giving them a second chance in life as they experience various setbacks that will test their limits.

Cast

Main cast

Supporting cast

Original Soundtrack

See also
 List of programmes broadcast by Mediacorp Channel 8
 List of Fire Up episodes

Awards & Nominations

Star Awards 2017
Fire Up had the second least nominations in the Star Awards 2017.

The other drama serials that are nominated for Star Awards 2017 are Hero (2016 TV series), C.L.I.F. 4, You Can Be an Angel 2 & The Dream Job.

It has not won a single nomination.

References

Singapore Chinese dramas
2016 Singaporean television series debuts
2016 Singaporean television series endings
Mediacorp Chinese language programmes
Channel 8 (Singapore) original programming